Mays may refer to:

People
 Benjamin Mays (1894–1984), American minister, educator, and social activist 
 Billy Mays (1958–2009), American television commercial salesman
 Brook Mays, investor in the Brook Mays Music Group
 Cade Mays (born 1999), American football player
 Carl Mays (1891–1971), American baseball player
 Carol Jean Mays (1933–2021), American politician from Missouri
 Daniel Mays (born 1978), English actor 
 David Mays, co-founder and co-owner of The Source magazine
 Devante Mays (born 1994), American football player
 Dorothy Mays (born 1957), American model and actress
 J Mays (born 1954), American industrial designer and Group Vice President of Design for the Ford Motor Company
 Jayma Mays (born 1979), American actress
 Jerry Mays (disambiguation)
Jerry Mays (defensive lineman) (born 1939), American football player 
Jerry Mays (running back) (born 1967)
 Joe Mays (disambiguation)
Joe Mays (pitcher) (born 1975), American baseball player
Joe Mays (catcher) (1914–1986), American baseball player
Joe Mays (American football) (born 1985), American football player
 Lee Mays (born 1978), American football player
 Lowry Mays (1935–2022), founder and current chairman of Clear Channel Communication
 Lyle Mays (1953–2020), American jazz pianist and composer
 Mark Mays, president and CEO of Clear Channel Communications
 Matt Mays (born 1979), Canadian singer-songwriter 
 Melinda Mays (born 1962), American model and actress
 Raqiyah Mays (born 1975), American hip-hop journalist and radio personality
 Raymond Mays (1899–1980), English auto racing driver
 Reta Mays (born 1975), American serial killer
 Rex Mays (1913–1949), American race car driver
 Sadie Gray Mays (1900–1969), American social worker
 Stafford Mays (born 1958), American football player
 Taylor Mays (born 1988), American football player
 Travis Mays (born 1968), American basketball player
 Willie Mays (born 1931), American baseball player
 Wolfe Mays (1912–2005), British philosopher

Other uses
 May Anthologies ("The Mays"), anthologies of new writing by Oxford and Cambridge University students
 Mays, Indiana, a small town in the United States
 May Bumps, an annual June rowing event on the River Cam in Cambridge, England
 J.W. Mays, an American department store

See also
 May (surname)
 Mayes, a surname
 Maize, or corn